Please note: Shakespeare Schools Festival became Shakespeare Schools Foundation in 2016. The Festival is the charity's flagship project. 

The Shakespeare Schools Festival is the world's largest youth drama festival. Schools who participate perform half-hour abridged versions of Shakespeare's plays in local, professional theatres all over the United Kingdom. Since its inception in 2000, it has worked with 250,000 young people and their teachers.

Parent charity Shakespeare Schools Foundation (SSF) aims to engage children through an active way of learning. The charity strives to bridge "the attainment gap" by boosting articulacy and confidence, as well as imparting key employability skills such as teamwork, peer leadership and critical thinking. In preparing and performing the plays participants also learn about Shakespeare's language, themes and characters. All schools are able to take part in the Festival.

History 

The Festival began in 2000 and is now in its 17th year.

1995 Shakespeare: The Animated Tales

In 1995, twelve of Shakespeare's best loved plays were abridged to half hour scripts for the S4C and BBC Wales series, Shakespeare: The Animated Tales. Ninety per cent of the UK's secondary schools now use the Tales as their introduction to the language and plays of Shakespeare for years 7-10 (11-15 year olds), making it BBC Education's most popular series. In 2009 the films were made available by the DCSF to all English primary schools. In summer 2013 all twelve episodes were re-released on DVD in the UK by Metrodome Group Plc. They are distributed by Shakespeare Schools Festival.

2000 Pembrokeshire: 8 schools, 240 pupils, 1 theatre

In 2000, Chris Grace, Director of Animation at S4C and Executive Producer of Shakespeare: The Animated Tales, and Penelope Middelboe, Series Editor of the same series, launched the Shakespeare Schools Festival. Leon Garfield's 12 abridgements for the animated series were made available by S4C to pupils and their teacher-directors from eight schools in Pembrokeshire. These secondary school students performed over two nights to sell-out audiences at the Torch Theatre, Milford Haven.

2001 London: 60 schools, 1,500 pupils, 3 theatres

October 2001 saw 1,800 pupils from 60 inner city London schools performing in three professional theatres. The Festival culminated in a Gala night at the West End's Duke of York's Theatre, which was attended by Cherie Booth QC and the Secretary of State DCMS, Tessa Jowell, who called the evening “one of the year’s cultural highlights”.

2002 Wales: 100 schools, 2,500 pupils, 10 theatres

With the support of the Welsh Assembly Government, the Arts Council of Wales and Cardiff 2002, Jenny Randerson AM launched the Wales 2002 Festival in the Old Library, Cardiff on 17 September. 3,000 pupils from 100 schools across the country performed in Welsh, English or bilingually, in one of 11 professional theatres.

2003 South West, West Midlands & Yorkshire

Embarking on a three-year cycle to cover the whole of England and Wales, the Festival was launched nationwide at a reception hosted by Cherie Booth QC at 10 Downing St.

8,500 young actors from 340 schools performed in 32 theatres across the regions. Three schools were picked to perform at a private reception for the Washington state visit in Downing Street, in front of an audience which included Tom Stoppard and Philip Pullman. They went on to perform again for the Arts & Kids 'Million Kids' launch at the Hackney Empire in the presence of the Prince of Wales.

2004 London, North West, East England

The year started with a fund-raising performance at the West End's Peacock Theatre in the presence of the Prince of Wales and Festival Patron, Kwame Kwei-Armah. In the summer one of the London schools took part in the National Youth Theatre's 'Shakespeare In The Square event', securing themselves coverage on BBC London's regional news.

During the Festival 10,000 pupils from 380 schools performed in 38 theatres.

2005 East Midlands, North East & South East England

Tom Stoppard's abridgement of The Merchant of Venice was premiered at the Linbury Theatre, Royal Opera House by a company of 2004 Festival performers and the National Youth Theatre. During the same year the BBC invited SSF to stage a one-day Festival in 100 theatres across the UK on Sunday 3 July as the launch of their Shakespeare Season, One Night of Shakespeare. Schools performed in theatres from the Shetland Isles to Bodmin, from Enniskillen to Margate and set the model for the Festival to become fully UK-national. The event set the world record for the most people performing Shakespeare on a single day (7,104) and SSF attained a place in the Guinness Book of Records.

20,000 pupils from 800 schools performed in 140 theatres.

2007 Shakespeare Schools Festival, UK-wide

For the first time, the Shakespeare Schools Festival is held across the entire UK between the 5–9 February 2007. 22,000 pupils from 1056 schools performed in 110 theatres.

A fund-raising dinner was held at the Middle Temple, hosted by Anna Ford and Charles Dance. Cameo performances from participating schools were held at the National Theatre hosted by patron Nicholas Hytner.

2008 SYF, S24, Shakespeare in the City and Festival

February–March 2008 saw the launch of the Shakespeare Youth Festival (SYF), a UK-wide pilot which gave 16- to 21-year-olds the opportunity to set up their own theatre company, to direct, produce, manage, tech, market and perform their own 45 minute abridgement of a Shakespeare play. 118 groups took part in 35 theatres.

Shakespeare 24 (S24) was an exciting worldwide Shakespeare performance event beginning in New Zealand and ending 24 hours later in Hawaii on 23 April 2008. 65 youth groups from 35 countries staged 30 and 45 minute adaptations of Shakespeare's plays at 7pm, local time on Shakespeare's 444th birthday. One of the best productions from SYF, Jamila Gavin's abridgement of Measure for Measure was performed by the National Youth Theatre at Playhouse in Liverpool. The event was appraised by Phil Redmond, director of Liverpool, European Capital of Culture.

As part of the European Capital of Culture year SSF worked throughout Liverpool, with young companies from the Shakespeare Youth Festival performing in 33 venues and locations from museums and cathedrals to parks and bombed out churches.

To cap off a busy year, Shakespeare Schools Festival returned in the Autumn with 10,000 pupils from 500 Schools performing in 60 theatres UK-wide.

2009 Shakespeare Schools Festival, UK-wide

SSF joined in partnership with the National Theatre (providers of the Teacher Director workshops) and the National Youth Theatre (providers of the Cast workshops). NT directors and actors such as Carl Heap, Dominic Hill, Adrian Lester, Phyllida Lloyd, Hattie Morahan joined Nicholas Hytner in giving master classes for teachers. A contemporary script based on All's Well That Ends Well, written by Lucinda Coxon, was offered by the NT to teachers who had done SSF before. Jenny Agutter appraised performances at The Unicorn Theatre, Southwark and became a festival patron.

10,000 young people from 500 schools performed in 67 theatres.

2010 Shakespeare Schools Festival, UK-wide

Over 10,000 young people from 500 schools performed in 70 theatres. Harriet Walter became a patron.

2011 Shakespeare Schools Festival, UK-wide

In July 2011 SSF held one of its more unusual fundraising events, putting Romeo on trial for the murder of Tybalt at Gray's Inn. SSF patrons Philip Pullman and Jenny Agutter took the witness stand in the roles of Friar and Nurse. Criminal QCs for the defence included John Kelsey-Fry QC and Claire Montgomery QC.

Also in 2011 SSF ran audition workshops for 2000 young people across the UK for BBC Learning's project Off By Heart Shakespeare. Eight finalists from each of the nine regions were filmed delivering their Shakespeare speeches. Festival Director, Chris Grace, whittled these down to just nine young finalists who spent three days with the RSC at Stratford before taking part in a filmed final in the main theatre at Stratford with Jeremy Paxman as host. Judges were Simon Schama, Imogen Stubbs and Sam West.

For the first time the festival is offered to primary schools, in a pilot project involving 50 primaries. In total 13,000 young people from 600 schools performed in 80 theatres. Francesca Martinez became a patron.

2012 Shakespeare Schools Festival, UK-wide

In 2012 SSF was invited by the British Museum education department to run workshops for secondary school students visiting the Shakespeare: Staging the World exhibition.

17,500 young people from 700 schools (179 primary) performed in 90 theatres. Michael Rosen and Ralph Fiennes both became patrons.

2013 Shakespeare Schools Festival, UK-wide
25,000 young people from 1,000 schools performing in 120 theatres.

2015 Shakespeare Schools Festival, UK-wide

In 2015 SSF decided again to place one of Shakespeare's characters on trial. This time, Macbeth. The event was largely improvised by the actors and lawyers involved, but based on a framework written by Jonathan Myerson. The cast included Christopher Eccleston as Macbeth, Haydn Gwynne as Lady Macbeth, David Oakes as Banquo, Paterson Joseph as MacDuff and Pippa Bennett-Warner as one of the Weird Sisters. The event interrupted the events of Shakespeare's play following the death of Duncan and placed Macbeth on trial for Murder with David, Patterson and Haydn appearing as witnesses for the prosecution and Christopher and Pippa as witnesses for the defence. The event was overseen by High Court Judge, Sir Michael Burton, the QC's were John Kelsey-Fry QC, Jonathan Laidlaw QC, Dinah Rose QC and Ian Winter QC, and the foreman of the Jury was Jeremy Paxman.

2016 Shakespeare Schools Festival, UK-wide

27,550 young people from 1,093 schools performed abridged Shakespeare plays in 131 theatres across the UK. SSF staged performances at 10 Downing Street, in Westminster Abbey and a West End Gala and at the Queen's 90th birthday.  

SSF hosted the Trial of Hamlet fundraiser. Tried by QCs in front of Lady Justice Hallett, evidence from Gertrude, played by Meera Syal, Claudius,
played by Tom Conti, and Player King, played by Lee Mack, was insufficient to find Hamlet, played by John Heffernan, guilty for the murder of Polonius. SSF's young performers shared the stage with this extraordinary cast.

Patrons 

 Lord Puttnam
 Dame Judi Dench
 Sir Tom Stoppard
 Sir Nicholas Hytner
 Kwame Kwei-Armah
 Cherie Booth QC
 Philip Pullman
 Sir Arnold Wesker
 Jamila Gavin
 Jenny Agutter
 Francesca Martinez
 Dame Harriet Walter
 Michael Rosen
 Ralph Fiennes

References

External links
Official Website

Shakespeare festivals in the United Kingdom
Educational charities based in the United Kingdom
2000 establishments in the United Kingdom
Recurring events established in 2000
Children's theatre
Children's charities based in the United Kingdom
Theatre festivals in England
Theatre festivals in Scotland